

Events
Somewhere in 1958 the Sicilian Mafia composed its first Sicilian Mafia Commission. It was formed among Mafia families in the province of Palermo, which had the highest concentration of cosche (Mafia families), approximately 46. Salvatore "Ciaschiteddu" Greco was appointed as its first segretario (secretary) or rappresentante regionale, essentially a "primus interpares" – the first among equals. Initially, the secretary had very little power. His task was simply to organize the meetings.
As a result of the Apalachin Conference, the FBI is forced to acknowledge the existence of organized crime and begins compiling a detailed report on the Mafia, known as, "La Cosa Nostra".
In a prelude to the Gallo-Profaci gang war, Gallo begins operating independently of the Profaci crime family. 
January 9 – Hitman Elmer "Trigger" Burke is executed for the murder of bartender Edward Walsh.
August 2 – Sicilian mafia boss, Michele Navarra murdered by Bernardo Provenzano and Salvatore Riina on the orders of Luciano Leggio, who subsequently becomes boss of the Corleonesi.
September 7 - John "the Mortician" Robilotto, a suspected gunman involved in the murder of Willie Moretti, is shot and killed sometime after 3 a.m., his body dumped in a gutter in Brooklyn. He had been shot four times in the head with a .38 caliber pistol.

Arts and literature
I Mobster (film)

Births
February 21 – Salvatore Cuffaro, Sicilian President and mafia associate
November 11 – Victor Peirce, Melbourne underworld figure and Pettingil family member
February 4 - John Zancocchio, Bonanno Crime Family member

Deaths
January 9 – Elmer "Trigger" Burke, Hitman
August 2 – Michele Navarra, Sicilian (Corleonesi) mafia boss
September 7 - John Robilotto, Albert Anastasia gunman

References

Organized crime
Years in organized crime